Heather Sirocki is an American politician who served in the Maine House of Representatives from 2010 to 2018.

References

Living people
Republican Party members of the Maine House of Representatives
Women state legislators in Maine
People from Scarborough, Maine
Year of birth missing (living people)
21st-century American women